"My Life Is Going On" is a song performed by Cecilia Krull. The song is the theme song of the Netflix Spanish TV series Money Heist (known in Spanish as La Casa de Papel), included on the album La Casa de Papel / Money Heist – The Soundtrack.

Background
As of June 2020, the song's music video has over 82 million views on YouTube. It is widely known as the theme song of the series Money Heist, which became one of Netflix's biggest successes in 2018.

Remixes
The theme song of one of the most successful Netflix TV series, and for example with the remixes of the Turkish Burak Yeter the song has climbed the international charts.

Burak Yeter version
Turkish DJ Burak Yeter made a remix of the song, which quickly became the most well-known version of the song internationally. As of April 29, 2020, the video has more than 41 million views on YouTube.

Gavin Moss version
The song was released on the French market with its remix version of Gavin Moss.

Tyler ICU and Nicole Elocin version
The Amapiano version from the South African record producer, Tyler ICU and the female singer-songwriter, Nicole Elocin is mostly recognized within the country.

Official videos

Cecilia Krull original version
The video was distributed on 14 November 2017, it is built from clips from the first season of the TV series Money Heist.

Gavin Moss remix
The video was distributed on 11 May 2018 and is uniquely made up of an image of a red sweatshirt with the names of the performers (Gavin Moss and Cecilia Krull) and the title of the song overwritten.

Burak Yeter remix
The video was distributed on 21 June 2018. The video alternates images of the DJ set of Turkish disc jockey Burak Yeter, with images of the Apollo 11 moon landing. The feature by Cecilia Krull is highlighted by the text of the sung part superimposed.

Chart

Cecilia Krull original version

Year-end charts

Gavin Moss remix

Burak Yeter remix

Year-end charts

Certifications

References

External links
 My Life Is Going On at Spotify

Money Heist
2017 singles
2017 songs